Arbutus Grove Provincial Park is a 22 hectare provincial park located on Vancouver Island in British Columbia, Canada. It was established on 21 July 1966 to protect a representative strand of Arbutus tree.

The park is located within the larger Mount Arrowsmith Biosphere Region.

See also
Mount Arrowsmith Biosphere Region

References

External links

Provincial parks of British Columbia
Mid Vancouver Island
1966 establishments in British Columbia